Whitehaven is a town on the coast of Cumbria, England.

Whitehaven or White Haven may also refer to:

Places
Whitehaven, Ottawa, Ontario, Canada
Whitehaven, Maryland, U.S.
Whitehaven, Memphis, Tennessee, U.S.
Whitehaven (Paducah, Kentucky), U.S., a historic house 
Whitehaven (house), a Clinton family-owned mansion in Washington, D.C., U.S.
Whitehaven Beach, on Whitsunday Island, Australia
White Haven, Montana, U.S.
White Haven, Pennsylvania, U.S.
Ulysses S. Grant National Historic Site, also known as White Haven

Other uses
 Whitehaven Coal, Australian coal miner
 Whitehaven R.L.F.C., a rugby league team
 Whitehaven A.F.C., an amateur football club
 White Haven (Honorverse), a fictional character in a book series by David Weber
 Ryzen, CPUs of the Zen 1 Threadripper line by Advanced Micro Devices